James Allison Green (October 24, 1930 – June 6, 2011) was a former Democratic member of the Pennsylvania House of Representatives.

He was born in Evans City, Butler County, Pennsylvania to Fred Allison and Ioda Pearl Barkley Green.

He died at a hospital in Pittsburgh in 2011.

References

Democratic Party members of the Pennsylvania House of Representatives
2011 deaths
People from Butler County, Pennsylvania
1930 births